Surinder Kaur (born 12 July 1982 in Shahbad Markanda, Kurukshetra District, Haryana) is a member of the India women's national field hockey team. She hails from Haryana and played with the team when it won Gold at the 2004 Hockey Asia Cup.

References 
 Biography

1982 births
Living people
Punjabi people
Field hockey players from Haryana
Indian female field hockey players
Recipients of the Arjuna Award
Sportswomen from Haryana
Asian Games medalists in field hockey
Field hockey players at the 1998 Asian Games
Field hockey players at the 2006 Asian Games
Field hockey players at the 2010 Asian Games
Asian Games silver medalists for India
Asian Games bronze medalists for India
Commonwealth Games medallists in field hockey
Commonwealth Games silver medallists for India
21st-century Indian women
21st-century Indian people
Medalists at the 1998 Asian Games
Medalists at the 2006 Asian Games
Field hockey players at the 2006 Commonwealth Games
Field hockey players at the 2010 Commonwealth Games
Medallists at the 2006 Commonwealth Games